Michel Fragasso (1888-1954), originally from Cerignola, in the province of Foggia in Italy was a Quebec engineer who participated in the design and production of several public offenses in Quebec, Canada. He had married Clara Taché, daughter of the architect Eugène-Étienne Taché who is the author of the plans of the Parliament of Quebec, the Armory of Quebec as well as the motto of the Quebec: "I remember".

Biography 
At the end of his engineering studies in Liège, Michel Fragasso immigrated to Quebec in 1912 to pursue a career as an engineer. In addition to having participated in the construction of the Quebec bridge around 1913, this engineer erected several dams, in particular those of the Jacques-Cartier lakes, in the Laurentides Wildlife Reserve, and of the Sautauriski Lake, located in Jacques-Cartier National Park.

The toponym "Lac Fragasso" was formalized on October 19, 1990, by the Commission de toponymie du Québec referring to the work of life of Michel Fragasso.

See also 
 Fragasso Lake

Notes and references 

1888 births
1954 deaths
Engineers from Quebec
People from Foggia
Italian emigrants to Canada
Date of birth missing
Date of death missing
Place of death missing
20th-century Canadian engineers
Canadian civil engineers
Canadian people of Belgian descent
People from Cerignola